William Denison McKinney (September 12, 1931 – December 1, 2011) was an American character actor. He played the sadistic mountain man in John Boorman's 1972 film Deliverance and appeared in seven Clint Eastwood films, most notably as Captain Terrill, the commander pursuing the last rebels to "hold out" against surrendering to the Union forces in The Outlaw Josey Wales.

Early life
William Denison McKinney was born September 12, 1931, in Chattanooga, Tennessee. He had an unsettled life as a child, moving 12 times. At the age of 19, he joined the Navy during the Korean War. He served two years on a mine sweeper in Korean waters, and was stationed at Port Hueneme in Ventura County, California. While on leave, he visited Los Angeles and decided he wanted to become an actor. Upon his discharge in 1954, he settled in California, attending acting school at the famous Pasadena Playhouse in 1957. His classmates included Dustin Hoffman and Mako Iwamatsu. During this time, McKinney supported himself by working as an arborist, trimming and taking down trees. He continued working in this field until the mid-1970s, by which time he was appearing in major films.

Career
After the Pasadena Playhouse he moved onto Lee Strasberg's Actors Studio, making his movie debut in exploitation pic She Freak (1967). For 10 years he was a teacher at Cave Spring Middle School. He made his television debut in 1968 on an episode of The Monkees and attracted attention as Lobo in Alias Smith and Jones. The film Deliverance (1972) proved to be his breakthrough.

McKinney's other films in the early 1970s included appearances in Junior Bonner (1972), The Life and Times of Judge Roy Bean (1972) and The Parallax View (1974).

It was with Clint Eastwood that McKinney would become most associated, becoming part of Eastwood's stock company after they worked together in Michael Cimino's Thunderbolt and Lightfoot (1974).

He appeared in The Outlaw Josey Wales (1976) under Eastwood's direction. He appeared in six more Eastwood films including The Gauntlet (1977), Every Which Way but Loose (1978), Any Which Way You Can (1980) and Pink Cadillac (1989).

Other memorable roles include Jay Cobb, who is done in by John Wayne in Wayne's final film The Shootist (1976). He also appeared in such later films as First Blood (1982), Back to the Future Part III (1990) and The Green Mile (1999). He appeared in the TV movie The Execution of Private Slovik (1974) and guest-starred on such television shows as Sara, The Young Indiana Jones Chronicles, Starsky & Hutch, The A-Team, Hunter, Murder, She Wrote, Columbo: Swan Song and In The Heat of The Night.

McKinney took up singing in the late 1990s, eventually releasing an album of standards and country and western songs appropriately titled Love Songs from Antri, reflecting Don Job's pronunciation of the infamous town featured in Deliverance. One of his songs featured in the film Undertow, directed by David Gordon Green. He voiced Jonah Hex in an episode of Batman: The Animated Series called "Showdown". He appeared in a cameo in 2001 Maniacs (2005) and had a role in the Robin Hood–inspired horror film Sherwood Horror (2010).

Death
On December 1, 2011, McKinney died from esophageal cancer at his home in San Fernando, California. He was 80. McKinney's death was announced on his Facebook page on the same day. The announcement read:

Today our dear Bill McKinney passed away at Valley Presbyterian Hospice. An avid smoker for 25 years of his younger life, he died of cancer of the esophagus. He was 80 and still strong enough to have filmed a Dorito's commercial 2 weeks prior to his passing, and he continued to work on his biography with his writing partner. Hopefully 2012 will bring a publisher for the wild ride his life was. He is survived by son Clinton, along with several ex-wives. R.I.P. Bill sept.12 1931 – dec. 1 2011" [sic].

Selected filmography

 She Freak (1967) – Steve St. John
 Firecreek (1968) – Bearded Gunfighter (uncredited)
 The Road Hustlers (1968) – Hays
 Angel Unchained (1970) – Shotgun
 Deliverance (1972) – Mountain Man
 Junior Bonner (1972) – Red Terwiliger
 Kansas City Bomber (1972) – Buddy Taylor (uncredited)
 The Life and Times of Judge Roy Bean (1972) – Fermel Parlee
 Cleopatra Jones (1973) – Purdy
 The Outfit (1973) – Buck Cherney
 Thunderbolt and Lightfoot (1974) – Crazy Driver
 The Parallax View (1974) – Parallax Assassin
 For Pete's Sake (1974) – Rocky – Cattle Rustler (uncredited)
 Breakheart Pass (1975) – Rev. Peabody
 The Outlaw Josey Wales (1976) – Captain Terrill
 Cannonball (1976) – Cade Redman
 The Shootist (1976) – Cobb
 Valentino (1977) – Policeman
 The Gauntlet (1977) – Constable
 Every Which Way but Loose (1978) – Dallas (Black Widow)
 When You Comin' Back, Red Ryder? (1979) – Tommy Clark
 Carny (1980) – Marvin Dill
 Bronco Billy (1980) – Lefty LeBow
 Any Which Way You Can (1980) – Dallas (Black Widow)
 St. Helens (1981) – Kilpatrick
 Tex (1982) – Pop McCormick
 First Blood (1982) – Captain Dave Kern
 Heart Like a Wheel (1983) – Don 'Big Daddy' Garlits
 Against All Odds (1984) – Head Coach
 Final Justice (1985) – Chief Wilson
 The Highwayman (1987, TV Series) – Deputy Stephan
 Under the Gun (1988) – Miller
 War Party (1988) – The Mayor
 Kinjite: Forbidden Subjects (1989) – Father Burke
 Pink Cadillac (1989) – Coltersville Bartender
 Back to the Future Part III (1990) – Engineer
 Love, Cheat & Steal (1993) – Kolchak
 City Slickers II: The Legend of Curly's Gold (1994) – Matt
 Lone Justice 2 (1995) – Verlon Borges
 Walker Texas Ranger (1995) - Sheriff Bridges (Episode:Point After)
 Where's Marlowe? (1998) – Uncle Bill
 The Green Mile (1999) – Jack Van Hay
 Paradise (2000) – Kerr
 Hellborn (2003) – Gas Station Attendant
 The Commission (2003) – Roy S.Truly
 Looney Tunes: Back in Action (2003) – Acme VP, Nitpicking
 True Legends of the West (2003) – The Mayor
 Undertow (2004) – Grandfather
 2001 Maniacs (2005) – The Chef
 The Garage (2006) – Bernie
 The Devil Wears Spurs (2006) – Barkepper
 The Bliss (2006) – Mr. Hill
 Take (2007) – Benjamin Gregor
 Lucky You (2007) – Satellite Cashier
 Ghost Town (2007) – Victor Burnett
 Pride and Glory (2008) – Crime Scene Cop
 Fuel (2009) – Jake
 How Do You Know (2010) – Maitre d'
 The Custom Mary (2011) – The Silent Boss (final film role)

References

External links
 
 

1931 births
2011 deaths
American country singer-songwriters
American male film actors
American male singer-songwriters
Country musicians from Tennessee
Deaths from cancer in California
Deaths from esophageal cancer
Male actors from Georgia (U.S. state)
Male actors from Tennessee
People from Chattanooga, Tennessee
Singer-songwriters from Tennessee